George Washington State Campground is an overnight camping facility in Chepachet, a village in the town of Glocester, Rhode Island. The campground is managed by the Rhode Island Department of Parks and Recreation, and is located on Putnam Pike (Route 44).

The site contains  the George Washington Memorial State Forest covering  of protected forest land, and a 100-acre primitive camping area without electrical hookups. The area contains Bowdish Reservoir and two smaller ponds.

References

External links

Protected areas of Providence County, Rhode Island
State parks of Rhode Island
Glocester, Rhode Island
Lakes of Providence County, Rhode Island